Love Conquers All is a 2006 movie by Malaysian director Tan Chui Mui.

Synopsis
Ping (Coral Ong Li Whei) has come from Penang in the north to Kuala Lumpur to work with her aunt. There she meets John, a young man who keeps trying to approach her. Ping feels increasingly attracted to John, and although she has a boyfriend in Penang she is drawn more and more into his world. Ping loses herself in her love and does all she can to keep John.

Cast
 Coral Ong Li Whei (Ping)
 Stephan Chua Jyh Shyan (John)
 Leing Jiun Jiun (Mei)
 Ho Chi Lai (Hong Jie)

Release history

Awards
It has won several awards such as:

 The Swiss Oikocredit award at Fribourg
 Tiger award at Rotterdam International Film Festival
 New Current Award at Pusan International Film Festival

References

External links
 Da Huang Pictures
 Love Conquers All DVD
 Variety.com - Russell Edwards
 Kakiseni - Benjamin McKay
 Review: Monsterblog.com.my
 Review: Suanie.net
 Review: A Nutshell Review
 

2006 films
2000s Mandarin-language films
2006 romantic drama films
Chinese-language Malaysian films
Malaysian romantic drama films
Films produced by Amir Muhammad
Da Huang Pictures films
Films directed by Tan Chui Mui
Malaysian independent films
2006 independent films
Films with screenplays by Tan Chui Mui